The John W. Birchmore House in Abilene, Kansas was built in 1878.  It was listed on the National Register of Historic Places in 2014.

It is a two-story brick Second Empire-style house.  It was deemed notable as "a good example of the Second Empire style executed on a single-family residence in Abilene."

References

Houses on the National Register of Historic Places in Kansas
Second Empire architecture in Kansas
Houses completed in 1878
Dickinson County, Kansas